Simara may refer to:

Simara, Sarlahi, a village development committee in Sarlahi District, Nepal 
Simara Bhawanipur, a village development committee in Rautahat District, Nepal
Simara, Bara, a town in Bara District, Nepal
Simara Airport, an airport in Nepal
Simara Island, an island in the province of Romblon, Philippines